The diving competition at the 1970 British Commonwealth Games in Edinburgh, Scotland counted a total number of four medal events: two events for both men and women. Diving took place at the purpose-built Royal Commonwealth Pool.

Canada performed the strongest at the event, winning 6 medals overall, including the gold and silver at both women's events. Canada missed out on a clean sweep of medals on the women's event by a small margin, with Australia's Gaye Morley beating Canada's Nancy Robertson on the 3m event by less than 4 points, while on the 10m event, Canada's Kathleen Rollo missed out on a bronze medal to England's Shelagh Burrow by just 0.3 points. All four girls were described as being "overcome by the tension" in what were emotional scenes. On winning the 3m event, Beverley Boys conveyed that she did not feel as confident in that event as she was feeling for the upcoming 10m tower event. Her total score of 432.87 in the 3m event was her highest ever achieved in an international competition.

Canada's overall performance at the event was praised by The Brandon Sun, who described the country as being a "dominant power in Commonwealth Games diving", following the second gold medal won by Beverley Boys. The 1970 women's diving event was the start of a gold medal winning streak for the Canadian team that would last until the 1982 Commonwealth Games, where Canadian women competitors had to settle for silver medals.

Don Wagstaff, who picked up gold in both of the men's events, became the first Australian man to win a gold medal in a springboard event at any previous Olympic or Commonwealth Games. Wagstaff was described as having given "the best exhibition of spring-board diving seen by an Australian", which was witnessed by his mum who had to save $1000 in order to travel to the games.

In each of the four events, competitors from the host country Scotland finished last.

Medal table

Medalists

Results

Men

Women

References
Citations

Sources
 

1970
1970 in water sports
1970 British Commonwealth Games events